David J. Francis may refer to:

 David J. Francis (academic), American psychologist
 David J. Francis (actor) (born 1970), Canadian actor, director, producer, editor and screenwriter
 David Francis (film archivist) (born 1935), British film archivist
 David J. Francis (politician) (born 1965), Chief Minister of Sierra Leone